Kohneh Lu (also Romanized as Kohneh Lū and Kohnehlū; also known as Chakhnali) is a village in Sina Rural District, in the Central District of Varzaqan County, East Azerbaijan Province, Iran. At the 2006 census, its population was 521, in 104 families.

References 

Towns and villages in Varzaqan County